Tikrit District is a district of Saladin Governorate, Iraq. Its leading city is Tikrit.

Districts of Saladin Governorate